Princess Myeonghye (Hangul: 명혜공주, Hanja: 明惠公主; 12 January 1663 – 11 June 1673) was a Korean princess as the second daughter of Hyeonjong of Joseon and Queen Myeongseong.

She married a son of Shin Jeong (신정), named Shin Yo-gyeong (신요경), who was later honoured as Prince Consort Dongan (동안위, 東安尉). However, the Princess was unable to celebrate and suddenly fell ill. She died on April 27, 1673. Her tomb was originally located near Heolleung (헌릉, 獻陵; the tomb of King Taejong and Queen Wongyeong), but was later moved to another place.

After her only brother, Crown Prince Yi Sun, ascended the throne, he ordered the building of shrines for Princess Myeonghye and Princess Myeongseon.

Others
The royal monument of Princess Myeonghye remains in the Jeongnimsaji Museum, Buyeo-eup, Buyeo County, South Chungcheong Province. The width is 52.9 cm and the height is 179 cm.
Bongguk Temple (봉국사, 奉國寺), a temple in Sujeong District, Seongnam, Gyeonggi Province, was once rebuilt in order to be used to pray for Princess Myeonghye and her older sister, Princess Myeongseon.

References

17th-century Korean people
17th-century Korean women
1662 births
1673 deaths
Princesses of Joseon
Royalty and nobility who died as children